Balabhadrapuram is an Indian village in Biccavolu  mandal of East Godavari district, Andhra Pradesh.

Villages in East Godavari district